Montauk is a hamlet and census-designated place (CDP) in the Town of East Hampton in Suffolk County, New York, on the eastern end of the South Shore of Long Island. As of the 2020 United States census, the CDP's population was 4,318.

The hamlet encompasses a small area about halfway between the two points.

The Montauk Point Light was the first lighthouse in New York state and is the fourth oldest active lighthouse in the United States.

Montauk is a major tourist destination and has six state parks. It is particularly famous for its fishing, claiming to have more world saltwater fishing records than any other port in the world.

History

17th century
Montauk derives its name from the Montaukett tribe, an Algonquian-speaking tribe who lived in the area. In 1614, Dutch explorer Adriaen Block encountered the tribe at Montauk Point, which he named , or "Point of the Fishers". Two decades later, in 1637, the Montauketts sided for their own protection with the New England settlers in the Pequot War in Connecticut. In the aftermath the Montauketts were to sell Gardiners Island. In 1648 what would become the Town of Easthampton (first Maidstone) was sold to settlers by the colony of Connecticut and the colony of New Haven while retaining the lands to the east, from the hills rising above where the first fort stood (Napeague, New York) to Montauk Point. The western boundary of today's Hither Hills State Park is also known as the 1648 purchase line.

In 1653, Narragansetts under Ninigret attacked and burned the Montaukett village, killing 30 and capturing one of Chief Wyandanch's daughters. The daughter was recovered with the aid of Lion Gardiner (who in turn was given a large portion of Smithtown, New York in appreciation). The Montauketts, ravaged by smallpox and fearing extermination by the Narragansetts, were provided temporary refuge by white settlers in East Hampton. Many short but famous battles ensued. The skirmishes ended in 1657. Fort Pond Bay derives its name from a Montaukett "fort" on its shore. A deed was issued in 1661 titled "Ye deed of Guift" which granted all of the lands east of Fort Pond to be for the common use of both the indigenous people  and the townsmen.

Further purchase agreements were entered into in 1661, 1672 and 1686 which, among other things, allowed a group of Easthampton townsmen to graze cattle on the Montaukett lands. While some lands were protected in the agreements as forest land, for the most part, all of Montauk was maintained by the townsmen as a private livestock and fisheries operation. As a result of Montauk being operated as a livestock operation, it is considered to be the oldest cattle ranch in the United States.

In 1660, Wyandanch's widow sold all of Montauk from Napeague to the tip of the island for 100 pounds to be paid in 10 equal installments of "Indian corn or good wampum at six to a penny".  However, the tribe was to be permitted to stay on the land, to hunt and fish at will on the land, and to harvest the tails and fins of whales that washed up dead on the East Hampton shores. Town officials who bought the land were to file for reimbursement for rum they had plied the tribe. The tribe was to continue residence until the 19th century in the area around Big Reed Pond in what was to be called "Indian Fields".

In 1686, Governor of New York Thomas Dongan issued a patent creating the governing system for East Hampton. The patent did not extend beyond Napeague to Montauk. This lack of authority has formed the basis for various control disputes ever since.

18th century
During the Siege of Boston in the Revolutionary War, a British ship visited Fort Pond Bay in 1775 in search of provisions—notably cattle. John Dayton, who had limited troops at his disposal on a hill above the bay, feigned that he had more by walking them back and forth across a hill turning their coats inside out to make it look like there were more of them (a tactic referred to as "Dayton's Ruse").

In 1781, the British  ran aground near what today is called Culloden Point while pursuing a French frigate. The ship was scuttled, but its remains were discovered in the 1970s. It is now on the National Register of Historic Places and is the only underwater park in the state of New York.

The first hamlet of Montauk was built on Fort Pond Bay near what is now the train station for the Long Island Rail Road.

In 1792, Congress authorized construction of the Montauk Lighthouse. It was completed in 1796.

19th century

In 1839, slaves who had seized the schooner La Amistad came ashore in the hamlet looking for provisions after being told by the white crew they had returned to Africa. American authorities were alerted, and the slaves were recaptured and ultimately freed in a historically significant trial.

A judgment was entered in 1851 against the Trustees of the Freeholders and Commonalty of the Town of Easthampton, and on March 9, 1852, a deed to Montauk was given to plaintiffs Henry P. Hedges and others, because their predecessors had contributed the money to purchase Montauk from the native Montaukett Indians in the 1600s. This deed caused the lands covered by the Dongan Patent to be split, leaving the still unsettled lands at Montauk without government. Less than one month later, on April 2, 1852, a state law was passed that incorporated the Proprietors Montauks, establishing the corporation of the trustees of Montauk and affirming its right to govern.

Stephen Talkhouse was displayed in 1867 by P. T. Barnum as "the last king of the Montauks." Talkhouse became famous for his walks from Indian Fields to New York City.

The deed releasing claim to Montauk was entered on March 9, 1852. Benson also received clear title to the Montaukett property at Big Reed Pond, buying it from tribesmen for $10 each, and in one case one of the tribesmen's houses was burned down. The legitimacy of the transaction is still being contested in court by the tribe. Construction began in 1882 on seven Shingle-style "cottages" designed by Stanford White, which were the centerpiece of Benson's plans. The most prominent of the six Montauk Association houses is Tick Hall, which was owned by entertainer Dick Cavett from 1967 to October 2021, when he sold it for $23.6 million.

The first train from the Austin Corbin extension of the Long Island Rail Road pulled into Montauk in 1895, the land having been bought in 1882. Corbin planned to turn Montauk into a "shortcut", saving a day each way for voyages between New York City and London: ships would dock at the Fort Pond Bay terminal and passengers would travel by rail to New York City at ). Corbin built the dock on Fort Pond Bay, but the plans never materialized when, among other things, Fort Pond Bay was found to be too shallow and rocky to handle oceangoing ships.

In 1898, after the Benson/Corbin plan did not work out as planned, the United States Army bought the Benson property to establish a base called Camp Wikoff to quarantine Army personnel returning from the Spanish–American War. The most prominent of the returning quarantined soldiers were Theodore Roosevelt and his Rough Riders. Several soldiers died during the quarantine, prompting a visit from President William McKinley.

20th century

Early 20th century 

In 1924, Robert Moses began condemning the Benson land to establish state parks on either end of Montauk − Hither Hills State Park in the west and Montauk Point State Park in the east. The two parks were to be connected via the Montauk Point State Parkway.

In 1926, Carl G. Fisher bought most of the East End of Long Island for only $2.5 million. He planned to turn Montauk into the "Miami Beach of the North", a "Tudor village by the sea". His projects included blasting a hole through the freshwater Lake Montauk to access Block Island Sound to replace the shallow Fort Pond Bay as the hamlet's port; establishing the Montauk Yacht Club and the Montauk Downs Golf Course; and building Montauk Manor, a luxury resort hotel; the Montauk Tennis Auditorium, which became a movie theater (and is now the Montauk Playhouse); and the six-story Carl Fisher Office Building (later the Montauk Improvement Building and now The Tower at Montauk, a residential condominium). This last building remains East Hampton's tallest occupied building, as zoning ordinances restricted heights of later buildings. The 30 or so buildings Fisher put up between 1926 and 1932 were designed in the Tudor Revival style. Fisher had successfully developed Miami Beach before beginning his Montauk project, but although he continued to pour his money into the development, to the extent of $12 million in total, he eventually lost his fortune due to the Wall Street Crash of 1929, and most of his enterprises were shut down. Other hotels that opened at the time of Fisher's project include Gurney's Inn, built by W. J. and Maude Gurney, who had managed a Fisher hotel in Miami Beach.

In the Great Hurricane of 1938, water flooded across Napeague, turning Montauk into an island. Floodwaters from the hurricane inundated the main downtown, and it was moved  to the south, immediately next to the Atlantic Ocean.

Mid 20th century

During World War II the United States Navy bought most of the east end, including Montauk Manor, to turn it into a military base. Fort Pond Bay became a seaplane base. The U.S. Army established Camp Hero with  guns to protect New York shipping lanes. Several concrete bunker observation posts were built along the coast, including one immediately to the east of the Montauk Lighthouse. Base buildings were disguised so they would appear from above as a New England fishing village.

In 1951, sport fisherman Frank Mundus began to lead charter fishing trips out of Lake Montauk, initially looking for bluefish but soon found fishing for sharks was more lucrative. The sport of "monster fishing" became Montauk's signature draw.

On September 1, 1951, the Pelican, captained by Eddie Carroll, capsized in the shoals off Montauk Point, resulting in the deaths of 45 passengers and crew. The  Pelican was carrying 64 people, most of whom had taken the Fisherman's Special trains to the Montauk LIRR station from New York City. The boat left the Fishangrila Dock at Fort Pond Bay at 7:30 a.m., severely overloaded. After fishing in the Atlantic Ocean on the south side of Montauk for several hours, it returned home, encountering engine trouble on the way. The weather turned stormy, and a northeast wind developed against an outgoing tide, resulting in standing waves of several feet at Endeavor Shoals, just off the Point. The vessel, wallowing in the heavy seas, became unstable in its overloaded state, capsized and then foundered at 2:10 p.m. Nearby vessels were only able to rescue 19 passengers. The wreck was secured by fabled sport fisherman Frank Mundus and towed into Lake Montauk by the Coast Guard. As a result of the disaster, strict new regulations regarding overloading of fishing vessels were adopted nationwide.

In 1957, the Army closed Camp Hero, and it was taken over by the United States Air Force, which in 1958 built a  AN/FPS-35 radar. A massive building was erected to house its computers.

Late 20th century
In 1959, following the Kitchen Debate between United States Vice President Richard Nixon and Soviet Premier Nikita Khrushchev, the designers of the kitchen, including Raymond Loewy, announced plans to sell affordable prefabricated houses, called Leisurama, to be used for second homes. One of the houses was exhibited on the 9th floor of Macy's. Two hundred of the houses, the largest installation, were assembled at Culloden Point in Montauk.

In 1967, the United States Coast Guard announced plans to tear down the Montauk Lighthouse and replace it with a taller steel tower. After protests, the Coast Guard backed down from the plan. In 1982, the Air Force base formally closed, and the military began selling its surplus property.

Montauk Friends of Olmsted Parks LLC was established in 1994 to protect an extensive system of beaches and waterfront properties and roadways.

In 1995, Montauk became the birthplace of the extreme surfcasting technique known as skishing. The sport involves donning a wetsuit and flippers and swimming into the ocean with rod and reel to catch fish while drifting offshore.

21st century

In October 2007, a fishing boat dragged up a large 19th-century anchor, which was speculated to have been lost by the SS Great Eastern in 1862. In 2008, an unidentifiable carcass known as the “Montauk Monster” was discovered near the hamlet's business district, with much speculation as to its identity. In August 2016 OCEARCH designated the waters off of Montauk and the rest of the South Shore of Long Island as a birthing ground for great white sharks.

Geography

Climate
Montauk has a humid subtropical climate (Cfa), under the Köppen climate classification, and using the  isotherm, is one of the northernmost locations in North America with this climate type. The presence of the Atlantic Ocean brings warmer winters than inland areas of the same latitude as well as cooler springs and summers: despite an extensive urban heat island and warmer lows throughout much of the year, Central Park in Manhattan, as compared to Montauk, averages twice as many days with a low reaching  or below. Montauk's warm subtropical climate makes it a popular vacation destination in the winter for New Yorkers and people from upstate New York.

According to the United States Department of Agriculture's Agricultural Research Service, Montauk is in Plant Hardiness Zone 7b/8a, with an annual average extreme minimal temperature of 10 degrees Fahrenheit, which allows tropical plants to grow that would otherwise only be able to grow in the Deep South.

Demographics

As of the census of 2010, there were 3,326 people, down from 3,851 at the time of the 2000 census. There are 1,422 total households in the CDP. The population density was 190 people per square mile. There were 4,666 housing units. The racial makeup of the hamlet was 91.2% White, 3.3% African American, 0.6% Native American, 1.2% Asian, Native Hawaiian and other Pacific Islander 0.1% and 5.0% from other races. Hispanic or Latino of any race were 16.10% of the population.

There were 1,593 households, out of which 26.9% had children under the age of 18 living with them, 47.0% were married couples living together, 8.7% had a female householder with no husband present, and 37.7% were non-families. 28.6% of all households were made up of individuals, and 10.2% had someone living alone who was 65 years of age or older. The average household size was 2.41 and the average family size was 2.90.

In the CDP, the population was spread out, with 20.0% under the age of 18, 6.6% from 18 to 24, 33.9% from 25 to 44, 25.0% from 45 to 64, and 14.5% who were 65 years of age or older. The median age was 39 years. For every 100 females, there were 105.4 males. For every 100 females age 18 and over, there were 109.2 males.

The median income for a household in the CDP was $42,329, and the median income for a family was $50,493. Males had a median income of $40,063 versus $28,299 for females. The per capita income for the CDP was $23,875. About 8.3% of families and 10.6% of the population were below the poverty line, including 10.9% of those under age 18 and 8.5% of those age 65 or over.

Economy

Tourism 

Montauk is considered a beach resort, using its position at the tip of Long Island to promote itself as “The End" or "The Last Resort", and has become one of the busiest tourist locations in East Hampton. It has many restaurants, bed and breakfasts, and hotels, and is a popular vacation spot in the warm months. Such accommodations are rarer elsewhere in the Hamptons. Many Montauk hotels are only open from April to November, some for shorter time periods, and a few year-round, including Gurney's Inn.

The Montauk station on the Long Island Rail Road provides train service along the Montauk Branch to other parts of Long Island and to New York City, and Hampton Jitney provides bus service to Manhattan. Suffolk Transit's 10C and seasonally operated S94 bus routes serve the village. The 10C connects the village with East Hampton and the Amagansett, East Hampton and Montauk Long Island Rail Road stations on the Montauk Branch, and the seasonally operated S94 connects the village with the Montauk Point Light. Small planes can fly into the Montauk Airport.

Lake Montauk, a small bay on the north side of town, is home to a US Coast Guard station and a small fishing fleet, both commercial and recreational.

In 2007, Newsday listed 47 businesses in the category of "Hotel" in Montauk. They represented 2,030 rooms.

Montauk is a favored destination for weekend partiers who, as of 2015, had exceeded the local inhabitants' tolerance for noise and disruption.

Parks and recreation
Montauk's six state parks, from west to east, are:

 Hither Hills State Park
 Shadmoor State Park
 Montauk Downs State Park
 Amsterdam Beach State Park
 Camp Hero State Park
 Montauk Point State Park

In addition, there is Montauk County Park and several East Hampton parks and Nature Conservancy areas.

Notable people
 Edward Albee, Pulitzer Prize-winning playwright, who died in 2016 in his home there
 Peter Beard, photographer
 Perry B. Duryea Jr. (1921–2004), politician
 Tor Lundvall, artist and musician
 Bernie Madoff, investment banker, fraudster, convicted felon, world's largest Ponzi scheme operator
 Fred Melamed, actor
 Paul Simon, singer and songwriter
 Toots Thielemans, jazz musician
 Rufus Wainwright, singer-songwriter
 Andy Warhol, artist and entrepreneur, bought the Church Estate in Montauk − also known as Eothen − in 1972
 Tuesday Weld, actress
 Pinchas Zukerman, conductor

In popular culture

Films

1964 – The science fiction thriller The Flesh Eaters began shooting on location in Montauk in 1962, when exterior sets and equipment suffered extensive damage from Hurricane Alma, halting production. Shooting was delayed for nearly a year while the producers regrouped to meet the escalating budget. The film was finally released on March 18, 1964.
1975 – The character Quint from the movie Jaws, played by Robert Shaw, was based on Frank Mundus, a shark hunter from Montauk. In the movie, Quint mentions he "caught a 16-footer [shark] off of Montauk."
1979 – Cocaine Cowboys was based almost entirely in Montauk, including at Andy Warhol's mansion.
1982 – In the film Deathtrap, thriller playwright Sidney Bruhl, played by Michael Caine, lives on Montauk, which he calls "the end of the line. Bloody symbolic."
1997 – Montauk is an important location in the film Commandments.
2004 – Montauk plays a prominent role in the film Eternal Sunshine of the Spotless Mind.
2009 – Montauk is the setting for the movie Paper Man starring Jeff Daniels and Ryan Reynolds.
2013 – Montauk is a major setting of the film Peeples.
2017 – The plot of the film Return to Montauk was inspired by Max Frisch's 1975 novel Montauk.
2017 – The fictional St. Martin's Orphanage in Death Note is in Montauk.

Television
1991 – In the debut episode of Fishing with John, host John Lurie takes guest Jim Jarmusch off the coast of Montauk to catch a shark.
1997 – In the episode "The One at the Beach" in season 3 of the American sitcom Friends, the six friends go to Montauk to find out more about Phoebe Buffay's birth mother.
2007 – Montauk is the main setting of episode 208 of Engaged and Underage on MTV, with Maribel and Julio working, residing, and getting married in the town.
2011–15 – The fictional bar "The Stowaway" in Montauk is a central location in the TV series Revenge.
2012 – The first episode of the reality TV series Hotel Impossible features Gurney's Inn in Montauk.
2014–19 – The Showtime TV series The Affair is set in Montauk.
2016-present: Montauk was the original title and setting of the Netflix television series Stranger Things, created by the Duffer Brothers. 
2017 – The first season of the Summer House reality TV series was filmed at a rental house at 90 Napeague Harbor Road on the extreme western edge of the Census Designated Place of Montauk which includes the hamlet of Montauk.

Music
1975–76 – The Rolling Stones stayed at Andy Warhol's estate in Montauk when they were on tour in 1975–76. The Memory Motel was said to be the only place in the area, at the time, with a pool table and a piano, and the Stones were said to hang out at the bar. The song "Memory Motel" was written during this period.
1990 – Billy Joel's song "The Downeaster Alexa", from his album Storm Front, tells the story of a Long Island fisherman's journey from Montauk through Block Island Sound on his ship.
2003 – Long Island indie rock band Brand New describes a shipwreck – a metaphor for a romantic break-up – off the tip of Montauk Point in the final song, "Play Crack the Sky", of their album Deja Entendu.
2005 – Circa Survive has a song titled "Meet Me in Montauk" from their album Juturna
2005 – Ryan Star's song "Losing Your Memory", from the album 11:59, references Montauk to demonstrate he still thinks of the girl he left behind.
2005 – Bayside, a punk band from Queens, has a song entitled "Montauk".
2008 – The trance group Signalrunners released a song entitled "Meet Me in Montauk"
2012 – Rufus Wainwright wrote a song called "Montauk" which is dedicated to his daughter Viva and appears on his album Out of the Game.

Literature
1975 – Montauk is a novel by the Swiss writer Max Frisch which centers on the narrator's open relationship with Lynn, an American journalist; the novel inspired the 2017 film Return to Montauk.
1992 – Long Island residents Preston B. Nichols and Peter Moon wrote a science fiction novel, The Montauk Project: Experiments in Time, in which it was claimed the radar was used by the government to conduct time travel experiments, dubbed The Montauk Project. Among the claims is that it drove the residents of Montauk mad and their children were kidnapped. The book and its sequels were to expand on many Montaukett tales and other East End stories. The book has been perceived by some to be true, and the base has assumed something of a cult status among conspiracy buffs. It was also featured in a segment of the X-Files television series.
2003 – In the novel The Interpreter, by Suki Kim, the female protagonist Suzy Park visits Montauk, where the ashes of her parents have been committed to the sea.
2005 – Percy Jackson and his mother visit Montauk on vacation and are attacked by a Minotaur there in the fantasy-adventure novel The Lightning Thief.
2013 – Montauk is the subject of a conspiracy theory in Thomas Pynchon's novel Bleeding Edge.

Comics
1968 – present The fictional Legion Academy, a training center for super-powered individuals run by the Legion of Super-Heroes in the 30th and 31st Centuries of the DC Universe is at Montauk Point.

Gallery

References

External links

Census-designated places in New York (state)
East Hampton (town), New York
Hamlets in New York (state)
Census-designated places in Suffolk County, New York
Hamlets in Suffolk County, New York
Populated coastal places in New York (state)